Bödefeld is a locality in the municipality Schmallenberg in the High Sauerland District in North Rhine-Westphalia, Germany.

The village has 1102 inhabitants and lies northeastern of the municipality of Schmallenberg at a height of around 488 m. The river Palme flows through the village. Bödefeld borders on the villages of Gellinghausen, Westernbödefeld, Brabecke, Osterwald, Obervalme (Bestwig), Lanfert, Hiege and Walbecke. 

The first written document mentioning Buodevelden dates from 1072 in a charter from Grafschaft Abbey of bishop Anno of Cologne. Hunold von Hanxleden was bailiff of Fredeburg and Lord (Herr) of Bödefeld. In 1410 he was granted permission by the Electorate of Cologne to build the castle of Bödefeld. Construction lasted from 1425 to 1428. 

The village used to belong to the municipality of Freiheit Bödefeld in Amt Fredeburg until the end of 1974.

Gallery

External links 
Bödefeld

References

Villages in North Rhine-Westphalia
Schmallenberg